Jasmin Perković (born 25 December 1980) is a Croatian basketball player, currently playing for Kvarner 2010 of the Croatian second-tier Prva muška liga. A veteran of more than two decades, he played in the EuroLeague, the Greek Basket League and the Italian Lega Basket Serie A over the course of his career.

Playing career
In July 2019, Perković signed with Tindastóll of the Icelandic Úrvalsdeild karla. In 17 games, he averaged 8.7 points and 7.1 rebounds in 25 minutes per game before the season ended prematurely due to the coronavirus pandemic in Iceland. The following season, he stayed in Iceland, signing with 1. deild karla club Hrunamenn in July 2020. In his debut with Hrunamenn, on 2 October, he had 12 points and 14 rebounds in a 95–81 victory against Selfoss. That turned out to be his last game for Hrunamenn as in November 2020, the club announced that Perković was forced to retire from professional basketball due to a hip injury. In 2021, he joined Kvarner 2010. He appeared in 7 games for the rest of the season, averaging 17.0 points and 5.1 rebounds per game.

National team career
In 2001, Perković helped Croatia finish second in the FIBA Under-21 World Championship.

References

External links
EuroLeague profile
Icelandic statistics
RealGM profile
Proballers.com profile

1980 births
Living people
Croatian men's basketball players
Ungmennafélagið Tindastóll men's basketball players
Úrvalsdeild karla (basketball) players
KK Kvarner players
KK Kvarner 2010 players
Kuwait SC basketball players
KK Škrljevo players